Raffaele "Ralph" De Palma (December 19, 1882 – March 31, 1956) was an Italian-American racecar driving champion who won the 1915 Indianapolis 500. His entry at the International Motorsports Hall of Fame estimates that he won about 2,000 races. DePalma won the 1908, 1909, 1910, and 1911 American AAA national dirt track championships and is credited with winning 24 American Champ car races. He won the Canadian national championship in 1929. DePalma estimated that he had earned $1.5 million by 1934 after racing for 27 years. He is inducted in numerous halls of fame. He competed on boards and dirt road courses and ovals.

Biography
Born in Biccari, Apulia, Italy, DePalma's family emigrated to the United States in 1893. As a young man he tried bicycle racing with mixed success, but at the age of twenty-two he began racing motorcycles before switching to the automobile dirt track racing circuit in 1909, the year that the American Automobile Association established the national driving championship.

DePalma was immediately successful in car racing. In 1911, DePalma won the first Milwaukee Mile Championship Car race. However, he is still remembered for the dramatic manner in which he lost the 1912 Indianapolis 500. After leading the race for 196 of the 200 laps, his Mercedes cracked a piston and with only 2 laps remaining; he and his mechanic had to push the car across the finish line to take eleventh place.  At that time, only cars completing the full 200 laps received any prize money. This Mercedes remains on display at the Indianapolis Motor Speedway Hall of Fame Museum.

He went on to earn the U.S. national driving championship that year, but was almost killed in an accident on October 5 at the Grand Prize held in a road course in Milwaukee. After being impaled by a corn stalk, he was hospitalized for 11 weeks; he recovered and was back to racing the following spring.

In 1912 and again in 1914, DePalma won the Elgin Trophy at Elgin, Illinois and in 1914 he scored what he called his greatest victory when he beat Barney Oldfield to capture the Vanderbilt Cup on the roads of Santa Monica, California. He entered the 1914 Indianapolis 500 and qualified, but withdrew before the race claiming he felt his engine could not survive the race.
DePalma had been let go by the Mercer Automobile Co. racing team in favor of Barney Oldfield. In a Mercedes "Gray Ghost," he showed he was a master tactician in beating Oldfield's much faster car. He ended 1914 by winning his second U.S. national driving championship. The following year, 1915, he drove to victory at 1915 Indianapolis 500 with a Mercedes 4.5 liter GP car.

DePalma was an intense competitor but one of the most popular racers with his fellow drivers and the fans because of his good sportsmanship, a quality he displayed on and off the track. In June 1917 he lost to Barney Oldfield in a series of 10 to 25 mile match races at the Milwaukee Mile. International competition began following the adoption of the three liter engine limit in the U.S. and Europe in 1920. DePalma began the year driving for the French manufacturer, Ballot. His Ballot vehicle won the pole position for the 1920 Indy race and he led for many laps but bad luck dogged him in the race (faulty bearings on the Ballot) and he did not finish. However, DePalma did race his Ballot vehicle in the Elgin Road Race and won his third Elgin trophy in 1920. Then in 1921 DePalma traveled with other Americans to Le Mans to compete in the French Grand Prix. There, he finished second to the Duesenberg driven by fellow American, Jimmy Murphy. DePalma won the Canadian national championship in 1929.

DePalma later competed in stock cars until he retired from racing in 1936. In his career, he competed in 2,889 races in America and Europe and won 2,557, according to his Associated Press obituary that appeared in the Detroit Free Press on April 1, 1956. He was an honorary referee for the Indianapolis 500, the last time in 1954.

Death
He died at his home in South Pasadena, California, from cancer on March 31, 1956 at age 73. He was interred in the Holy Cross Cemetery in Culver City, California.

Media appearances
Ralph DePalma had a small role in the 1920 Hollywood film, High Speed and in 1924 played the part of the Champion in an action/drama written by Wilfred Lucas titled Racing for Life. In 1923, he established the DePalma Manufacturing Company in Detroit to build race cars and engines for automobiles and aircraft.

He also had a cameo in The Cool Hot Rod (1953).

Family
DePalma was the brother of 500 competitor John DePalma and the uncle of 1925 Indy winner Peter DePaolo. De Palma obtained his American citizenship in 1920 (available at), and as such he is considered the third non-American driver to win the Indianapolis 500 after Jules Goux and René Thomas.

Awards
In 1973, he was made a posthumous member of the Automotive Hall of Fame in Dearborn, Michigan.
In 1991, he was inducted into the International Motorsports Hall of Fame.
He was named to the National Sprint Car Hall of Fame in 1991.
He was inducted in the Motorsports Hall of Fame of America in 1992.
In 2006, DePalma was inducted into the Elgin (IL) Sports Hall of Fame.

Indianapolis 500 results

DePalma's total of 612 laps led stood as the all time Indy lap leader record until tied by Al Unser on the 199th lap of the 1987 Indianapolis 500, and broken on lap 200.

References

External links

 Profile on Historic Racing
 The Greatest 33
 

1882 births
1956 deaths
Sportspeople from the Province of Foggia
American racing drivers
Indianapolis 500 drivers
Indianapolis 500 polesitters
Indianapolis 500 winners
International Motorsports Hall of Fame inductees
Land speed record people
National Sprint Car Hall of Fame inductees
Burials at Holy Cross Cemetery, Culver City
AAA Championship Car drivers
Italian emigrants to the United States